= One Million Bubbles =

- Genre: Balloon decoration
- Frequency: Annual
- Years active: 6
- Website: onemillionbubbles.org

The One Million Bubbles is an annual event organized by balloon artist Steven Jones featuring balloon artists from all over the world. The event was held for the first time in 2020 during the COVID-19 pandemic.

== History ==
The One Million Bubbles was organized by balloon artist Steven Jones of Balloon Designers and began in 2020 during the COVID-19 pandemic, the idea came to him when he noticed a grocery store customer was behaving poorly out of fear and anxiety, then he put a balloon mural outside his business including a simple message "Be safe, be kind." aiming at making people happy.

Three different projects were held in 2020, the first One Million Bubbles event was held under One Million Bubbles of Joy on March 26, 2020, featuring 384 balloon artists from 15 countries. The second event, One Million Bubbles of Hope took place on April 11 and 12, 2020 featuring 1,894 artists from 81 countries. The third event, One Million Bubbles of Love took place on May 9 and 10, 2020, featuring 406 participants.

In 2021, the event was held on April 24 and 25, 2021, featuring 225 artists from 23 countries. In 2022, the One Million Bubbles event was held between April 23 and 24.
